Rüti bei Riggisberg is a former municipality in the district of Seftigen in the canton of Bern in Switzerland.

On January 1, 2009, the Rüti bei Riggisberg became part of the municipality of Riggisberg.

Geography
Of this area, 32.1% is used for agricultural purposes, while 64.3% is forested. Of the rest of the land, 2.1% is settled (buildings or roads) and the remainder (1.5%) is non-productive (rivers, glaciers or mountains).

Demographics
Rüti bei Riggisberg has a population of 411.  , 1.9% of the population was made up of foreign nationals.  Over the last 10 years the population has decreased at a rate of -13.1%.  Most of the population speaks German  (98.9%), with French being second most common ( 0.7%) and Portuguese being third ( 0.5%).

In the 2007 election the most popular party was the SVP which received 72.7% of the vote.  The next three most popular parties were the FDP (8%), the FDP (8%) and the SPS (4.5%).

The age distribution of the population is children and teenagers (0–19 years old) make up 31.8% of the population, while adults (20–64 years old) make up 51.6% and seniors (over 64 years old) make up 16.7%.  In Rüti bei Riggisberg about 60% of the population (between age 25-64) have completed either non-mandatory upper secondary education or additional higher education (either University or a Fachhochschule).

Rüti bei Riggisberg has an unemployment rate of 1.24%.  , there were 99 people employed in the primary economic sector and about 34 businesses involved in this sector.  46 people are employed in the secondary sector and there are 6 businesses in this sector.  38 people are employed in the tertiary sector, with 7 businesses in this sector.

References

Former municipalities of the canton of Bern